1,1-Bis(chloromethyl)ethylene is the organic compound with the formula CH2=C(CH2Cl)2.  It is a colorless liquid. Featuring two allylic chloride substituents, it is dialkylating agent.

Synthesis and reactions
It is prepared from pentaerythritol via a multistep procedure, beginning with the partial chlorination. The compound reacts with diiron nonacarbonyl to give the complex of trimethylenemethane Fe(η4-C(CH2)3)(CO)3. It is also a precursor to [1.1.1]-propellane.

References

Chloroalkenes
Allyl compounds